Clearfield, Inc. manufactures and distributes passive connectivity products. Their fiber management and enclosure platform consolidates, distributes, and protects fiber through inside plant facilities, to outside plant facilities, to the home, and to the drop-off points in between. Clearfield's products service the wireless, cable, and telephone service providers, municipal-owned utilities, and non-traditional providers. Clearfield was founded in 2008 and is headquartered in Minneapolis, Minnesota.

History

1981–2008 
Clearfield’s history began in the late 1980s with the merging of Americable and Computer System Products. Moving forward under the business name Americable, in 2003 the company was purchased by APA Enterprises. In 2007, APA Enterprises changed course after several consecutive years of profit losses. In June 2007, Cheri Beranek took the new role of CEO. Under the new leadership, APA Enterprises redefined itself with a new vision by rebranding the Company as Clearfield at the start of 2008.

2008–Present 
Clearfield reported its first profitable quarter on September, 30th 2008. The company moved into its 60% larger Minneapolis Headquarters in January 2015.

Organization 
Clearfield, Inc. manufacturers its fiber optic components out of its corporate office in Minneapolis, Minnesota and out of its satellite plant in Tijuana, Mexico.

Awards 
 Clearfield rated #14 in the top 25 small businesses in America in 2013
 Eureka! Award for ingenuity and innovation

External links 
 Clearfield's Official Website

References 

Manufacturing companies based in Minnesota
American companies established in 2008
Networking hardware companies
Wire and cable manufacturers
Companies listed on the New York Stock Exchange